is a former Japanese football player.

Playing career
Yamanaka was born in Oita Prefecture on April 19, 1983. After graduating from high school, he joined J2 League club Mito HollyHock in 2002. On October 23, he debuted as substitute defender from the 88th minutes against Ventforet Kofu. However he could only play this match until 2003 and retired end of 2003 season.

Club statistics

References

External links

1983 births
Living people
Association football people from Ōita Prefecture
Japanese footballers
J2 League players
Mito HollyHock players
Association football defenders